Kargus is a 1981 Spanish drama film written and directed by Juan Miñón and Miguel Ángel Trujillo, at their feature film debut.
 
The film was entered into the main competition at the 38th edition of the Venice Film Festival.

Plot 

A series of Vignettes that begin at the Civil War and end at the Spanish Economic Miracle
is interwoven with 2 separate abstractions
 Seeking a Utopia in the Gilbert Islands
 A possible escape from the Social order to El "otro lado"
In Vignete 1 The train which is apparently going to Vizcaya? offers a
possible escape route (to France?)
In Vignette 2 We see an escape from the Oppressive Social Services 
that want the change a family (from being hunter gatherers) to fit back into the
state sponsored social order.
Vignette 3 Focuses on a schoolroom in the 1950s and suggests that one can
learn more from daydreaming than following the dry logic of the schoolmaster
Vignette 4 at a Rapid Driving School perhaps makes fun of a girl who only
looks at the inside of a vehicle and gets a rude awakening when she glimpse the
outside of the car
Vignete 5 Deals with graffiti removal where the technicians have to think
long and loud about the political meanings to choose which graffiti they will remove and 
which they will allow.

Cast 
 
  Héctor Alterio  
 Laura Cepeda
 Francisco Algora
  Luis Ciges
 María Vaner
 Gustavo Pérez de Ayala
 María Luisa Ponte

References

External links

1981 drama films
Spanish drama films
1981 directorial debut films
1981 films
1980s Spanish-language films
1980s Spanish films